Jaime Posada Díaz (18 December 1924 – 2 July 2019) was a Colombian politician who served as Ministry of National Education. He died on 2 July 2019 at 95 years of age.

References

1924 births
2019 deaths
Colombian Ministers of National Education
Governors of Cundinamarca Department